Christopher Odhiambo Okinda (born 15 December 1980), is a Kenyan actor. He is best known for the roles in the films The Constant Gardener and The White Massai. Apart from acting, he is also a film director, producer, author and Radio presenter.

Personal life
He was born on 15 December 1980 in Mombasa, Kenya to Elizabeth Apiyo Aruwa and Alois Okinda. His father was  polygamous, therefore he was raised by his mother, with whom he lived. He first attended  Aga Khan Primary School (Parklands, Kenya) and then Our Lady of Mercy Primary School in 1992. Later, he moved to St Peter's Mumias Boys primary in 1994 and finally St Mary's School (in Yala) in 1996.

Career
In 2005, he started film debut with the thriller film The Constant Gardener directed by Fernando Meirelles. Okinda played a minor supportive role as 'Doctor' in the film. The film received positive critical acclaim and screened at several film festivals.

With the success of his maiden acting appearance, he was then selected to the 2005 The White Massai. Meanwhile, he founded the theater film Company 'Something Productions'. Through the company, he made the plays in his mother's native Dholuo language. Apart from acting, he currently work as the morning show radio host and creative director of 'Hot 96 FM' in Kenya.

Filmography

References

External links
 

Living people
1980 births
People from Mombasa
21st-century Kenyan male actors
Kenyan male film actors